Bajva is a census town in Vadodara district  in the state of Gujarat, India.

Demographics
 India census, Bajva had a population of 9118. Males constitute 53% of the population and females 47%. Bajva has an average literacy rate of 68%, higher than the national average of 59.5%; with 58% of the males and 42% of females literate. 12% of the population is under 6 years of age.

References

Cities and towns in Vadodara district